The 1936–37 Stanford Indians men's basketball team represented Stanford University during the 1936–37 NCAA men's basketball season in the United States. The head coach was John Bunn, coaching in his seventh season with the Indians (now known as the Cardinal). The team finished the season with a 25–2 record and was retroactively named the national champion by the Helms Athletic Foundation and the Premo-Porretta Power Poll.

Hank Luisetti led the NCAA in scoring, was named a consensus All-American for the second consecutive season, and was named the Helms Foundation National Player of the Year. Luisetti was later inducted into the Naismith Memorial Basketball Hall of Fame.

The National Invitation Tournament (NIT) debuted the next year, and the NCAA tournament in 1939.

Schedule and results

|-
!colspan=9 style="background:#8C1515; color:white;"| Regular season

|-
!colspan=6 style=| Pacific Coast Conference Playoff Series

Source

References

Stanford Cardinal men's basketball seasons
Stanford
NCAA Division I men's basketball tournament championship seasons
Stanford Indians Men's Basketball Team
Stanford Indians Men's Basketball Team